Burnell Taylor (born April 14, 1993) is an American singer, who came in seventh place on the twelfth season of American Idol.

Early life
He graduated from Sarah T. Reed High School in 2011. He and his family were survivors of Hurricane Katrina.

American Idol

Taylor auditioned in Baton Rouge, singing "I'm Here". He performed the same song during the semifinals and made it to the top 10. During the top 10, 9, and 8 weeks, he was favored by judges and Jimmy Iovine (when compared to the other boys). He received the lowest number of votes after his top 7 performance of "You Give Love a Bad Name" by Bon Jovi, and was sent home on April 4, 2013 after the judges decided against using their "Judges' Save" power.

Performances and results

 When Ryan Seacrest announced the results for this particular night, Taylor was among the bottom three, but was declared safe first.

Post-Idol
Taylor took part in the American Idols LIVE! Tour 2013 from July 19 and to August 31, 2013. He performed with Nicki Minaj on her song "Pills N Potion" at the 2014 BET Awards on June 29, 2014.

References

External links
 Burnell Taylor on American Idol
 

American Idol participants
Living people
21st-century American singers
Singers from Louisiana
1993 births
21st-century American male singers

id:Burnell Taylor